Odil Akhmedov (Uzbek Cyrillic: Одил Аҳмедов; born 25 November 1987) is a former Uzbek professional footballer who played as a central midfielder. He represented Uzbekistan national team.

Club career

Early years
Born in Namangan Province, Akhmedov began playing football in reserve side of Pakhtakor Tashkent. After two seasons, he joined the first team and won the Uzbek League twice with the club.

Pakhtakor
He made his official debut for the first-team of Pakhtakor on 16 May 2006 aged 18, in an Uzbek League away match against Qizilqum Zarafshon.

It was revealed by Pakhtakor that Odil Ahmedov had received offers from foreign clubs such as the Russian Premier League members Krylia Sovetov Samara and FC Dynamo Moscow. But Pakhtakor officials believed that Odil Ahmedov deserves a better offer referring to the top European clubs such as the ones from England, Spain, Germany, Italy, and France.

After his stunning performance at the 2011 AFC Asian Cup, a lot of clubs showed interest in him, for example the Russian teams such as Rubin Kazan, Anzhi Makhachkala, and Lokomotiv Moscow, Spanish side Málaga CF, English side Bolton Wanderers, French side AS Monaco, Saudi side Al-Ittihad, Ukrainian sides Dynamo Kiev and Metalist Kharkiv, and the Turkish side Beşiktaş J.K. The highest prices were from the Saudi side Al-Shabab who have offered 8 million euros, and the Qatari side Al-Gharafa offering 12 million euros.

Since the European transfer window closed on 31 January, Odil Akhmedov could not play in a European club till the summer transfer window opens. He still have had the offer from Al-Shabab for 8 million euros, and Al-Gharafa for 12 million euros, he needed to make his decision before the clubs canceled their offer, or else he might be left at his current club Pakhtakor.

There were rumours that Odil Akhmedov was seen in front of the Jeonbuk's office.

On 4 February 2011 U.F.F. revealed that Odil Akhmedov moved to Russia where he would play his next season, but the name of the club was not revealed. According to unknown source Odil Akhmedov was going to play at Anzhi Makhachkala. Anzhi coach Gadzhi Gadzhiev revealed that the club didn't sign Odil Akhmedov. He went to Belek, Turkey, with his current team Pakhtakor Tashkent, and this is the same place where Anzhi Makhachkala is training. According to Pakhtakor, real offers only came from Al-Shabab and Anzhi, and rest was just rumours being spread. Pakhtakor also announced that Odil Akhmedov had been loaned to Anzhi Makhachkala for one year.

There has been rumours that England's Arsenal has been interested in Odil Akhmedov. Later Akhmedov confirmed the interest by Arsenal F.C.

Anzhi
On 9 February 2011, Ahmedov joined FC Anzhi Makhachkala on loan from Pakhtakor Tashkent.

On 13 February 2011 Ahmedov scored his first goal in his first match for Anzhi in friendly match against Obolon (Ukraine) with 1–0 win. He made his official debut in Russia in 2010–11 Russian Cup Round of 16 match against Zenit Saint Petersburg on 1 March 2011.

On 29 December 2011 Anzhi Makhachkala official website announced Ahmedov was named as the best player of the club over season 2011. The winner was determined with the survey conducted among official website visitors and finally by club managers and coaches. He collected more points than Samuel Eto'o and Yuri Zhirkov.

It was rumoured that he was set to leave Anzhi Makhachkala in summer 2014. England's Arsenal gave a bid of 4 million pounds, followed by Genoa and A.C. Milan.

FC Krasnodar

Prior to Anzhi suffering relegation, Ahmedov joined Krasnodar in early June 2014, along with teammates Nikita Burmistrov and Vladimir Bystrov. Weeks later, he was handed the number 10 shirt.

On 28 June 2014, he scored first goal on his debut match in friendly against Qarabağ FK in Austria. The game ended with 1–0 victory of Krasnodar. On 3 July 2014 he scored his second goal on his second appearance for FC Krasnodar to equalize against Scottish football giants Celtic F.C., due to an awful defending error they made. Unfortunately, the game ended 3–1, with FC Krasnodar losing.

Ahmedov scored his first official goal for Krasnodar on 1 August 2014 in 2014–15 UEFA Europa League third qualifying round match against Hungarian outfit Diosgyori VTK. Krasnodar won the match by 5–1, with Ahmedov scoring the team's second goal in the first half.

On 17 August 2014, Odil Ahmedov scored his first official league goal for Krasnodar against FC Rostov in a 2–0 win. He scored the second goal of Krasnodar against Rostov in second half, assisted with a cross by Vladimir Bystrov.
On 6 March 2015, UFF announced results of pool conducted among journalists for Best Footballers of the Year award and Ahmedov was named Uzbekistan Footballer of the Year for the third time.

Ahmedov was named Best Player of FC Krasnodar in 2014–15 season on 9 June 2015 after survey conducted on club official website. On 4 March 2016 he was named the Best Football Player 2015 in Uzbekistan for the 4th time as Football Federation announced the results of the survey.

Shanghai SIPG
On 30 December 2016, Ahmedov transferred to Shanghai SIPG of the Chinese Super League. He made his official debut on 7 February 2017 in a 3–0 win over Thai club Sukhothai in the 2017 AFC Champions League qualifying play-off.

Tianjin TEDA
In September 2020, Ahmedov was loaned to Tianjin TEDA. He joined Tianjin on a free transfer after the season.

Cangzhou Mighty Lions
In 2021, Ahmedov moved to Cangzhou Mighty Lions after Tianjin faced serious financial problem. He left the team during the CSL's interval. In December 2021, he announced his  retirement.

International career
He made his international debut with Uzbekistan in a 9–0 win against Chinese Taipei on 13 October 2007.

He is known for his tough tackling style and thunderbolt shots. It is said that he 'releases the Kraken' almost like John Arne Riise and it may be true as he scored the goal and possibly goal of the tournament of the 2011 AFC Asian Cup.

On 10 October 2019, Ahmedov played his 100th match for Uzbekistan against Yemen.

In June 2021, Ahmedov decided to retire from national team.

Career statistics

Club

International

International goals
Scores and results list Uzbekistan's goal tally first.

Honours 

Pakhtakor
 Uzbekistan Super League (2): 2006, 2007
 Uzbekistan Cup (3): 2006, 2007, 2009
 CIS Cup: 2007

Anzhi
 Russian Cup runner-up: 2012–13

Shanghai SIPG
Chinese Super League: 2018

Individual
 Uzbekistan Player of the Year (6): 2009, 2011, 2014, 2015, 2016, 2018
 Anzhi Player of the Year: 2011
 FC Krasnodar Player of the Year: 2014–15
 List of 33 top players of the Russian league: 2014–15

See also
 List of footballers with 100 or more caps

References

External links

 
 
 

1987 births
Living people
Association football midfielders
Uzbekistani footballers
Uzbekistani expatriate footballers
Uzbekistan international footballers
Pakhtakor Tashkent FK players
2011 AFC Asian Cup players
2015 AFC Asian Cup players
Uzbekistani expatriate sportspeople in Russia
Expatriate footballers in Russia
Russian Premier League players
FC Anzhi Makhachkala players
FC Krasnodar players
Shanghai Port F.C. players
Tianjin Jinmen Tiger F.C. players
Cangzhou Mighty Lions F.C. players
Expatriate footballers in China
Uzbekistani expatriate sportspeople in China
Chinese Super League players
Footballers at the 2010 Asian Games
2019 AFC Asian Cup players
Asian Games competitors for Uzbekistan
FIFA Century Club